Chanintorn Pohirun (born  June 1, 1990) is a Thai professional footballer who plays as an attacking-midfielder for Thai League 2 club Kasetsart.

External links
 

1990 births
Living people
Chanintorn Pohirun
Association football midfielders
Chanintorn Pohirun
Chanintorn Pohirun
Chanintorn Pohirun